The Great Vlaie is a swamp which is the source of the Sawyer Kill stream in Ulster County, New York.

See also 

Swamps of the United States
Wetlands of New York (state)
Landforms of Ulster County, New York